Gerhard Boetzelen (7 January 1906 – 27 February 1995) was a German rower who competed in the 1932 Summer Olympics.

In 1932 he won the silver medal with his partner Herbert Buhtz in the double sculls competition.

External links
 profile

1906 births
1995 deaths
Olympic rowers of Germany
Rowers at the 1932 Summer Olympics
Olympic silver medalists for Germany
Olympic medalists in rowing
German male rowers
Medalists at the 1932 Summer Olympics